Antonio Maria Sauli (sometimes Antonio Sauli) (1541–1623) was the Archbishop of Genoa and later a Roman Catholic Cardinal, serving as the dean of the College of Cardinals for the last three years of his life.

Sauli was born in Genoa.  He was a member of the Sauli Family which among other things provided three Doges of Genoa.  His father was Ottaviano Sauli and his mother Giustiniana.

Sauli was educated at the University of Bologna and the University of Padua.  Early in his life Sauli worked for the Republic of Genoa but later went to work for the Papal States.  He was Papal Nuncio to Portugal from 1579 to 1580.

Sauli was made Coadjutor Bishop of Genoa in 1585.  On the death of Bishop Cipriano Pallavicino the following year, Sauli became the Metropolitan Archbishop of Genoa.  He served in this position until 1591, although he was made a Cardinal in 1587.

Episcopal succession

References

External links and additional sources
 (for Chronology of Bishops) 
 (for Chronology of Bishops) 
 (for Chronology of Bishops) 

1541 births
1623 deaths
University of Bologna alumni
University of Padua alumni
Roman Catholic archbishops of Genoa
17th-century Italian cardinals
Apostolic Nuncios to the Kingdom of Naples
16th-century Italian Roman Catholic archbishops